Filipino South Korean or South Korean Filipino may refer to:
 Philippines–South Korea relations
 Filipinos in South Korea
 South Koreans in the Philippines
 Mixed race people of Filipino and South Korean descent